Lynn Edythe Burke (born March 22, 1943), also known by her married name Lynn McConville, is an American former competition swimmer, Olympic champion, and former world record-holder in two events.  She competed at the 1960 Summer Olympics in Rome, where she won the gold medal in women's 100-meter backstroke in a new Olympic record time of 1:09.3.  She won a second gold medal by swimming the backstroke leg for the winning U.S. team in the 4×100-meter medley relay, together with teammates Patty Kempner (breaststroke), Carolyn Schuler (butterfly), and Chris von Saltza (freestyle).  The U.S medley relay team set a new world record in the event final of 4:41.1.

Burke, overall broke six World records (lowering the 100 metre backstroke World record four times in just three months), broke seven American records, and won six National AAU titles.

Burke was inducted into the International Swimming Hall of Fame as an "Honor Swimmer" in 1978.  After retiring from competition in March 1961, she became a model, author and business woman in New York.  She has three children.

See also
 List of members of the International Swimming Hall of Fame
 List of Olympic medalists in swimming (women)
 World record progression 200 metres backstroke
 World record progression 4 × 100 metres medley relay

References

1943 births
Living people
Flushing High School alumni
American female backstroke swimmers
World record setters in swimming
Olympic gold medalists for the United States in swimming
Sportspeople from New York City
Swimmers at the 1959 Pan American Games
Swimmers at the 1960 Summer Olympics
Medalists at the 1960 Summer Olympics
Pan American Games competitors for the United States
21st-century American women